Cyclone Preparedness Programme is a disaster management program of the Government and Bangladesh Red Crescent Society in Bangladesh and is located in Dhaka, Bangladesh. The program is under the management of the Ministry of Disaster Management and Relief.

History
The program was developed to work as an early warning system in coastal Bangladesh in 1973 by President Sheikh Mujibur Rahman. The program has been credited with saving thousands of lives. The Indian Prime Minister, Narendra Modi, called it "Global Best Practice". It has 55 thousand volunteers.

References

Government agencies of Bangladesh
1973 establishments in Bangladesh
Organisations based in Dhaka
Disasters in Bangladesh
Disaster management